Philip S. Abrams is a computer science researcher who co-authored the first implementation of the programming language APL.

APL
In 1962, Kenneth E. Iverson published his book A Programming Language, describing a mathematical notation for describing array operations in mathematics.  In 1965, Abrams and Lawrence M. Breed produced a compiler that translated expressions in Iverson's APL notation into IBM 7090 machine code.
In the 1970s, he was vice president of development for Scientific Time Sharing Corporation (STSC), Inc.

Selected works 
 Abrams, Philip S., An APL Machine, Stanford Linear Accelerator Center (SLAC), February, 1970.

References

Year of birth missing (living people)
Living people
American computer scientists
APL implementers